Allur is a village in Kothapatnam mandal, located in Prakasam district of Andhra Pradesh, India.

Etymology
To distinguish it from other Allur, when both villages were in same Nellore district before Ongole district was created, it was called as Akula Allur or Allur with leaves and its namesake was called as Pantala Allur or Allur with staple.

Geography 
Vijayawada Airport is the nearest airport; Ongole is the nearest railhead.

References 

Villages in Prakasam district